The following lists events that happened during 1953 in the Grand Duchy of Luxembourg.

Incumbents

Events
 26 February–21 April 1953 - Battle of Chatkol during the Korean War. Luxembourg soldiers fought against 55 consecutive nights of Chinese assaults.
 9 April – Hereditary Grand Duke Jean marries Princess Joséphine-Charlotte of Belgium.
 1 May – First iron cast by the European Coal and Steel Community at Belval, Esch-sur-Alzette.
 12 May – Albert Goldmann is appointed to the Council of State.
 12 May – Léon Schaus is appointed to the Council of State.
 24 June – Law passed to build Esch-sur-Sûre Dam, which would create the Upper Sauer Lake.
 29 December – Prime Minister Pierre Dupong dies in office.  He is replaced by Christian Social People's Party colleague Joseph Bech, who leads the Bech-Bodson Ministry.

Births
 13 March – François Valentiny, architect
 1 July –  Nico Helminger, writer 
 3 July – Carlo Wagner, politician
 30 July – Nico Ries, soldier and Chief of Defence
 29 November - Mariette Kemmer, opera singer
 10 December – Nicolas Schmit, politician
 13 December – André Jung, actor

Deaths
 4 October – Prince Oscar, Duke of Gotland
 22 October – Helen Buchholtz, composer
 1 December – Aloyse Hentgen, resistance leader
 17 December – Nicolas Petit, architect
 29 December – Pierre Dupong, politician and Prime Minister

Footnotes

References